The Union Baptist Church is a historic Baptist church building located at 1219 Druid Hill Avenue in central Baltimore, Maryland.  The granite church was designed by New York architect William J. Beardsley and built in 1905 under the leadership of Rev. Harvey Johnson.  The Gothic Revival structure features steeply pitched roofs, lancet windows, and distinctive buttressing on the front facade to provide support for the walls on a constrained lot size.  The church was built for a predominantly African-American congregation established in 1852; its minister from 1872 to 1923, Rev. Harvey Johnson, was a prominent voice in the civil rights movement.

The building was listed on the National Register of Historic Places in 2009.

See also
National Register of Historic Places listings in Central Baltimore

References

External links
Union Baptist Church website
, including undated photo, at Maryland Historical Trust
Union Baptist Church – Explore Baltimore Heritage

African-American history in Baltimore
Properties of religious function on the National Register of Historic Places in Baltimore
Baptist churches in Maryland
Gothic Revival church buildings in Maryland
Churches completed in 1905
Churches on the National Register of Historic Places in Maryland
1905 establishments in Maryland
Baltimore City Landmarks